Stan Shaw (December 2, 1926 - February 2021) was a cutler, or "little mester", from Sheffield, England.

Early life
Shaw was born in Worrall, Sheffield to Walter Shaw and Amelia Shaw (nee Coldwell). He was one of eight children. His family later moved to Oughtibridge. His father was a ganister miner and died from silicosis at the age of 45. At the age of four, Shaw fell from a roof and landed on his hip. He subsequently also became ill with tuberculosis and spent ten years in hospital.

Career
Following discharge from hospital, Shaw began working for George Ibberson & Co, where he worked on hafting and finishing items of cutlery. Shaw subsequently worked for George Wostenholm, John Watts, and John Clarke. In 1983, Shaw set up his own business in Garden Street. In 2009, he moved to a workshop within the Kelham Island Museum. Towards the end of his career, he had a four-year waiting list for orders.

Retirement and death
Shaw stopped producing knives in 2019 due to ill health but continued to demonstrate his craftmanship to the public at the Kelham Island Museum. He died on 26 February 2021, at the age of 94.

References

1920s births
2021 deaths
People from Sheffield
Cutlers